Dorcadion nitidum is a species of beetle in the family Cerambycidae. It was described by Victor Motschulsky in 1838. It is known from Turkey and Armenia.

Varieties
 Dorcadion nitidum var. bifuscovittatum Breuning, 1946
 Dorcadion nitidum var. multialbovittatum Breuning, 1946
 Dorcadion nitidum var. suturatum Ferreira, 1864
 Dorcadion nitidum var. trifuscovittatum Breuning, 1946

References

nitidum
Beetles described in 1838